Fullinwider is a surname. Notable people with the surname include:

Edwin Fullinwider (1900–1982), American fencer
Jerry Fullinwider, American businessman